Srikaram ( Beginning) is a 1996 Telugu-language drama film, produced by Gavara Parthasaradhi under the Sri Chamundi Chitra banner and directed by C. Uma Maheswara Rao. It stars Jagapathi Babu, Heera Rajagopal, Meghana  and music composed by Ilaiyaraaja. The film won two Nandi Awards.

Plot
The film begins in a colony where resides a respectable family man Shanta Murthy. Siva a meliorist stays as a tenant at his penthouse. Shanta Murthy's elder daughter Vasanta and their neighbor Geeta like Siva's ideologies. Meanwhile, Siva's friend Chandram a crafty arrives at the colony. He distorts Shanta Murthy and propels his alliance with Vasanta. Parallelly, Siva acquires a fine job at a reputed college and nuptials Geeta. The next, Chandram & Vasanta proceeds on their honeymoon where tragically, 4 malefactors molest Vasanta walloping Chandram. The incident creates a severe catastrophe that blemishes the family. As a result, Shantha Murthy quits the town and Chandram expels Vasanta. During that plight, Siva & Geeta stands in for Vasanta and raises her spirit. Moreover, Siva seizes the violators and files the case in court. During the tribunal, Vasanta could not endure the coarse inquiry and she is on the verge to lose the case. At that point, Siva awakens consciousness in people which turns into revolution and that makes the culprits accept their crime. Afterward, Chandram is enforced to coalesce with Vasanta when she is subjected to domestic violence. At last, she foiled, unable to tolerate it, and slain her husband. Finally, the movie ends with the judiciary understanding the agony of Vasantha and acquitting her.

Cast

Jagapathi Babu as Siva
Heera Rajagopal as Geeta
Meghana/Aboli Patil as Vasantha 
Anand as Chandram
Satyanarayana as Shantha Murthy 
Nutan Prasad as Adavocate Prasad 
Benerjee
Venu Madhav
Gundu Hanumantha Rao as Masterji
Ananth Babu
Gowtham Raju
Jackie
Ram Jagan as Jagan
Chitti 
K.L.Prasad
Jwalamukhi
Ayesha Jalil as Janaki 
Amurtha as Saraswathi 
Swathi
Ratnamala
Madhabala
Shobharani
Tenali Shakunthala
Baby Syreshta

Soundtrack

Music composed by Ilaiyaraaja. Music released on MG Magna Sound Audio Company.

Awards
Nandi Awards - 1996
Third Best Feature Film - Bronze - G. Partha Sarathi
Best Lyricist - Sirivennela Sitarama Sastry

References

External links

1996 films
1990s Telugu-language films
Films scored by Ilaiyaraaja
Films about domestic violence